Winter Song is the 1973 EP by the pioneer British folk musician Wizz Jones. The songs were recorded on a tape recorder at concert promoter Willy Schwenken's house in Nottuln, Germany circa 1972. The recordings also came as a bonus EP with the Double Album Soloflight, and in 2007 were included as bonus tracks on the remastered CD release of When I Leave Berlin.

Track listing
"When You're Gone"  (Alan Tunbridge) - 2:40
"Come Back Baby"  (Lightnin' Hopkins) - 3:30
"Cocaine Blues"  (Rev. Gary Davis) - 3:10
"Frankie"  (Mississippi John Hurt) - 2:40
"Guitar Shuffle"  (Big Bill Broonzy) - 1:55
"Winter Song"  (Alan Hull) - 4:05

Personnel
Wizz Jones - guitar, vocals

Production
Producer: Wizz Jones
Recording Engineer: Willy Schwenken/Wizz Jones
Mixing: n/a
Photography: unknown

Wizz Jones albums
1973 EPs